Diboron tetrafluoride is the inorganic compound with the formula (BF2)2.  A colorless gas, the compound has a halflife of days at room temperature.  It is the most stable of the diboron tetrahalides.

Structure and bonding
Diboron tetrafluoride is a planar molecule with a B-B bond distance of 172 pm.  Although it is electron-deficient, the unsaturated boron centers are stabilized by pi-bonding with the terminal fluoride ligands.  The compound is isoelectronic with oxalate.

Synthesis and reactions
Diboron tetrafluoride can be formed by treating boron monofluoride with boron trifluoride at low temperatures, taking care not to form higher polymers.

Addition of diboron tetrafluoride to Vaska's complex was employed to produce an early example of a transition metal boryl complex:
2B2F4  +  IrCl(CO)(PPh3)2 →   Ir(BF2)3(CO)(PPh3)2  +  ClBF2

Historical literature

References

External links
 Diboron tetrafluoride at webelements

Fluorides
Boron compounds
Nonmetal halides
Boron halides